Dorothy Edwards (18 August 1902 – 5 January 1934) was a Welsh novelist who wrote in English. She became associated with David Garnett and other members of the Bloomsbury Group, but she stated in a note before committing suicide that she had "accepted kindness and friendship and even love without gratitude, and given nothing in return."

Upbringing
Edwards was born at Ogmore Vale, Glamorgan, the only child of Edward Edwards and his wife Vida. Her father was head of Tynewydd School, Ogmore Vale, where her mother had also worked before her marriage, and was a significant person in the Independent Labour Party and the British co-operative movement. Through him, Dorothy met notable socialists, including Keir Hardie and George Lansbury. At nine years old and dressed in red, she welcomed Hardie onto the stage in Tonypandy during the national coal strike of 1912.

Dorothy was taught to believe that a revolution was at hand and class and gender-based divisions would soon crumble, but as Claire Flay points out, her father's safe and relatively well-paid job set her apart from the rest of the community. She was not taught the Welsh language as a child, although her parents probably spoke some.

Dorothy won a scholarship to Howell's School for Girls in Llandaff, where she was a boarder. She then read Greek and philosophy at the University College of South Wales and Monmouthshire, predecessor of Cardiff University. Flay places her among a circle of ambitious, unconventional women. By this time her father had died and she lived with her mother in Rhiwbina. A short engagement to her philosophy lecturer, John MacCaig Thorburn, came to a difficult end.

Writing
After graduating, Edwards set aside her early ambition to become an opera singer, though Flay describes her as having an excellent singing voice. Nor did she follow her parents into teaching. She took a part-time, temporary job to augment her mother's pension and continued to work on short stories, several of which featured in literary journals. "A Country House", "Summer-time" and "The Conquered" appeared in The Calendar of Modern Letters. Rhapsody (1927), along with seven others she had written or revised during a nine-month visit to Vienna with her mother. In 1928 came a short novel, Winter Sonata, which Flay describes as restrained, multi-faceted and structurally innovative, deconstructing social and gender hierarchies in depicting an English village in winter. Both Rhapsody and Winter Sonata describe the marginalization of British women in the interwar period.

In the late 1920s Edwards became close friends with the Bloomsbury author David Garnett, who dubbed her his "Welsh Cinderella" and introduced her to other Bloomsbury Group members, including the artist Dora Carrington. In the early 1930s, she agreed to live with Garnett, his wife Ray and their family. In exchange for child care, she received board, lodging and space to write. The publisher E. E. Wishart offered her an advance on a new volume of stories to include "The Problem of Life", "Mutiny" and "Mitter". However, tensions arose between Garnett and Edwards. London friends grew weary of her outspokenness and the Welsh provincialism they saw in her. Edwards was aware of her socially inferior position, but still held her father's teachings in reverence and was drawn increasingly to the Welsh nationalist movement. Flay describes her as riddled with guilt at leaving her mother with a hired companion, frustrated at her dependence on the Garnetts, and reeling after a love affair with Ronald Harding, a married Welsh cellist.

Suicide and posthumous publications
On 5 January 1934, having spent the morning burning papers, she threw herself in front of a train near Caerphilly railway station. She left a suicide note: "I am killing myself because I have never sincerely loved any human being all my life. I have accepted kindness and friendship and even love without gratitude, and given nothing in return." She was cremated at Glyntaff, Pontypridd, on 9 January. Her mother died later that year.

"Mutiny" and "The Problem of Life" were published in Life and Letters To-day in 1934, but Edward's works were largely forgotten until Virago Press reissued Rhapsody and Winter Sonata in 1986. Christopher Meredith contributed an article about Rhapsody to Planet magazine no. 107 in 1994, and wrote an introduction for the Library of Wales edition of 2007, which once more brought the book into print. That edition also includes the two posthumously published stories as well as a previously unpublished story, "La Penseuse".   Winter Sonata appeared again in Honno Welsh Women's Classics in 2011, with an introduction by Claire Flay. Since then there has been stronger interest in her life and works. Edwards wrote a short story, "The Conquered", which was included in A View Across The Valley, an anthology reclaiming female Welsh nature writers.

Works
Rhapsody (short stories, 1927)
Winter Sonata (1928)

References

Welsh Biography Online
University of Reading Special Collections

1902 births
1934 deaths
1934 suicides
20th-century British short story writers
20th-century Welsh novelists
20th-century Welsh women writers
People from Bridgend County Borough
Welsh women novelists
Alumni of Cardiff University
Suicides in Wales
Suicides by train
People educated at Howell's School Llandaff
Welsh short story writers
British women short story writers
Welsh nationalists